Björn Karlsson (born January 7, 1989) is a Swedish professional ice hockey defenceman.

References

External links

1989 births
Living people
Swedish ice hockey defencemen
Växjö Lakers players